The International Gay Rodeo Association (IGRA), founded in 1985, is the sanctioning body for gay rodeos held throughout the United States and Canada. They are the largest group coordinating rodeo events specifically welcoming lesbian, gay, bisexual, transgender (LGBT) as well as heterosexual participants and spectators. IGRA is composed of many regional gay rodeo associations, and sanctions a season of rodeo events which culminates in an annual World Gay Rodeo Finals. IGRA events are intended to allow all competitors, regardless of sexual and gender identity, to compete in rodeo sports without discrimination. The organization helps spread appreciation for Western culture and the sport of rodeo, while serving as a fundraising vehicle benefiting many charitable organizations.

Competitors compete for prize money and the title of All Around Cowboy and Cowgirl at each rodeo. The winners of each event receive trophy buckles designed by the hosting association.  At season's end the contestants with the highest points in each event receive invitations to the World Gay Rodeo Finals presented by IGRA. The event was renamed in 2009 from the previous "International Gay Rodeo Finals" moniker it held from its onset in Hayward, California.

The original intent of these rodeos was fundraising, and while highly competitive and structured rodeos still serve the primary purpose of being fundraisers. The money raised at the rodeo is donated to the designated charities of each association. In total IGRA and all the associated associations have donated to furthering the individual causes of all charities that are benefactors of rodeo funds.

In 2010, the IGRA archives dating from 1975 were deposited in the library collection of the Autry National Center in Griffith Park, Los Angeles, which also houses the Museum of the American West.

The documentary film Queens & Cowboys follows the story of out cowboy, Wade Earp and others who compete in the IGRA. Earp discusses how he does not compete in rodeos outside IGRA because, "There's still a lot of homophobia. As progressive as we think the world's gotten, there's so much we have to conquer."

On November 9, 2014, CNN aired an episode of This Is Life with Lisa Ling that covered the Zia Regional Rodeo in Santa Fe, New Mexico, including profiles of several cowboys and cowgirls that are active on the IGRA circuit.

History 

The first gay rodeo was held as a charity fundraising event at the Washoe County Fairgrounds in Reno, Nevada on October 2, 1976.  The organizer, Phil Ragsdale, a member of the Imperial Court System, was the Court Emperor of Reno.  In time, he came to be regarded as the "Father of Gay Rodeo."

Ragsdale came up with the idea of a holding a rodeo to raise money for the local Thanksgiving Day food drive for senior citizens. Over 125 people took part in the first rodeo, and the winners were crowned King of the Cowboys, Queen of the Cowgirls, and Miss Dusty Spurs (drag queen). The National Reno Gay Rodeo title was officially created in 1977, when he founded the Comstock Gay Rodeo Association. Following the Imperial courts' lead Ragsdale added the "Mr., Ms., and Miss National Reno Gay Rodeo" titles to aid in the fund raising that was to benefit the Muscular Dystrophy Association. These titles still exist today but have been recognized as Mr., Ms., Miss., and MsTer International Gay Rodeo Association since the IGRA replaced the old National Reno format.

By 1984, the ninth and final National Reno Gay Rodeo brought out over 10,000 people to the rodeo grounds. The demise of the National Reno Rodeos is credited by the IRS as a dispute between the Gay Rodeo and the Washoe County Fairgrounds and the Sands Hotel. The rodeo books were also alleged to have been seized by the IRS.

History has recorded 14 gay rodeos (9 Reno rodeos, 3 Colorado rodeos, 1 Texas rodeo, and 1 California rodeo) prior to the formation of the International Gay Rodeo Association (IGRA).  The IGRA became truly international in 1993 when the Alberta Rockies Gay Rodeo Association from Canada joined.

In September 1985 with 10 years of rodeo history behind it, groups of men gathered in Denver, Colorado to formulate the history of Gay Rodeo. The five founding states of the International Gay Rodeo Association were Colorado, Texas, California, and Arizona. These four associations seated the Oklahoma Gay Rodeo Association at its first convention held in the same year. The new Association elected Wayne Jakino from Colorado as its first President.

In 1987, IGRA's first International Finals Rodeo was held in Hayward, California. The name was changed to the World Gay Rodeo Finals in 2009.

Conventions, Presidents, and Royalty

A list of presidents and royalty elected at annual conventions since IGRA was founded in 1985:

Note:  In 1988, "A contract with a private ranch sixty miles east of Reno was made void when the local homophobic District Attorney filed an injunction two days before the rodeo in order to stop the event. Two days in court as well as a trip to the Nevada Supreme Court failed to overturn the injunction," according to the IGRA website.  As a result, no finals were held that year.

Royalty Team

Like all traditional rodeos, IGRA rodeos also sponsor an annual royalty competition to determine the twelve individuals who will comprise the IGRA Royalty Team. Each fall the various associations send either their state winners or their first runners-up to compete for the Mr. (male that presents as male), Ms. (female that presents as female), Miss (male that presents as female), and MsTer (female that presents as male) International Gay Rodeo Association sashes.

A change to royalty competition rules in 2015 requires a contestant to compete in four of five categories. The five areas of competition are:
 Personal Interview - Mandatory
 Western wear modeling - Mandatory
 Public Presentation and On-Stage Question - Mandatory
 Horsemanship Skill - Required if not competing in Entertainment
 Public Entertainment - Required if not competing in Horsemanship

Criticism 

Animal rights organizations such as Mercy for Animals, Showing Animals Respect & Kindness (SHARK), People for the Ethical Treatment of Animals (PETA) and LGBT Compassion criticize Gay Rodeo for perceived cruelty to animals. In response to increased publicity given to critics of Gay Rodeo, IGRA published a press release stating that their animals are well-treated and handled in accordance with established ethical guidelines.

State and Regional rodeo associations

Current associations

Rodeos under the IGRA umbrella are organized into four divisions (see map here ) and more than two dozen regional associations:

 AGRA - Arizona Gay Rodeo Association, Phoenix, founded 1984
includes the state of Arizona except for the southeastern counties covered by SGRA (see below)
 ARGRA - Alberta Rockies Gay Rodeo Association, Calgary, founded 1991
includes Alberta, British Columbia, Manitoba, and Saskatchewan
 ASGRA - Atlantic States Gay Rodeo Association, Alexandria, Virginia, founded 1991
includes Washington DC, Maryland, Virginia, Delaware, New Jersey and metropolitan New York City
 CGRA - Colorado Gay Rodeo Association, Denver, founded 1981
 CSGRA - Cotton States Gay Rodeo Association, Birmingham, founded 2012
 DSRA - Diamond State Rodeo Association, Little Rock, Arkansas
 FGRA - Florida Georgia Rodeo Association (Formerly Florida Gay Rodeo Association), St. Petersburg
includes Florida and Georgia
 GSGRA - Golden State Gay Rodeo Association, Long Beach, California, founded 1984
Bay Area Chapter, San Francisco
Greater Palm Springs Chapter, founded 2000
Greater San Diego Chapter
the Sacramento area of California is covered by SCCGRA (see below)
 ILGRA - Illinois Gay Rodeo Association, Chicago
 KSGRA - Keystone State Gay Rodeo Association, Harrisburg, founded 2015
 LSGRA - Louisiana State Gay Rodeo Association, Bossier City, Pennsylvania
 MIGRA - Michigan International Gay Rodeo Association, Dearborn, founded 1994
 MGRA - Missouri Gay Rodeo Association, Kansas City, Missouri, founded 1986
includes the state of Missouri other than those counties covered by GWGRA (see above)
 NGRA - Nevada Gay Rodeo Association, Las Vegas, founded 1992
 NMGRA - New Mexico Gay Rodeo Association, Albuquerque, New Mexico, founded 1984
 NSGRA - North Star Gay Rodeo Association, St. Paul, founded 1989
includes Minnesota and Wisconsin
 OGRA - Great Plains Rodeo Association (formerly Oklahoma Gay Rodeo Association), Oklahoma City, founded 1985
 RRRA - Red River Rodeo Association, Aubrey, Texas, founded 2003
includes several counties north of the Dallas-Fort Worth Metroplex
 SCCGRA - Sacramento's Capital Crossroads Gay Rodeo Association, Sacramento, California
includes the Sacramento area of California
 SGRA - Sonoran Gay Rodeo Association, Tucson, Arizona
includes southeastern Arizona counties of Pima, Santa Cruz, Cochise, Graham, and Greenlee
 TGRA - Texas Gay Rodeo Association, Fort Worth, founded 1984
 Austin Chapter
 Dallas Chapter
 Fort Worth Chapter
 Houston Chapter
 San Antonio Chapter
includes the state of Texas except for several north-central counties covered by RRRA (see above)

Defunct associations

The following rodeo associations were once affiliated with IGRA but became inactive, and dissolved or reorganized:

 Pacific Coast Gay Rodeo Association (California), loosely organized in 1980; replaced by Golden State Gay Rodeo Association in 1984
 Cowboy State Rodeo Association (Wyoming), founded 1988, name changed the following year to Big Sky Gay Rodeo Association (Montana); dissolved 1998
 Oregon Gay Rodeo Association, seated at 1988 IGRA convention; replaced by Northwest Gay Rodeo Association in 1990
 Utah Gay Rodeo Association, seated at 1989 IGRA convention; dissolved 2006
 Northwest Gay Rodeo Association (Washington, Oregon, and Idaho), seated at 1990 IGRA convention; reorganized as Pacific Northwest Gay Rodeo Association
 Tri-State Gay Rodeo Association (Ohio, Indiana, and Kentucky), founded 1990, dissolved 1995
 Silver State Gay Rodeo Association (Nevada); reorganized as Nevada Gay Rodeo Association, 1992
 Pennsylvania Gay Rodeo Association seated at 1995 IGRA convention; name and coverage changed to PONY (Pennsylvania, Ohio, New York Gay Rodeo Association) in 1999; dissolved 2007

Competitions

Rules

Most associations host at least one annual rodeo. All associations  must follow the rules of conduct as outlined in the IGRA Rodeo Rule Book, the first edition of which was published in 1985. These rules are often updated and ratified at season's end when delegates from each association gather at the IGRA annual convention. The purpose of the convention is to elect new officers, create new rules and bylaws, and seat new associations.

Each of the thirteen events has a set of rules that must be followed in order for contestants to score points and to qualify for the year end finals. Unlike in traditional rodeos, contestants are allowed to compete in all events regardless of sex.  Buckles are awarded to the top male and female competitors in each event, as well as buckles for Rookie of the Year and for All-Around Cowboy and All-Around Cowgirl.

Rough Stock Events
 Bull riding
 Steer riding
 Chute Dogging or Steer wrestling
 Bareback bronc riding (this is an optional event)

Roping Events
 Calf roping on Foot
 Mounted Breakaway roping
Team roping

Speed Events
 Barrel racing
 Pole bending
 Flag Racing

Camp Events
 Wild Drag Race
 Goat Dressing
 Steer Decorating

References

External links
 IGRA Official Website
 Gay Rodeo History Archive - Created and managed by Cowboy Frank in conjunction with the IGRA Archives Committee
 IGRA Institutional Archives at the Autry Museum of the American West, Los Angeles
 Voices of Gay Rodeo - Oral histories from the International Gay Rodeo Association

Articles and interviews:
  lengthy interview with participants at an IGRA rodeo in Missouri
 "Out on the Range," The Guardian, 25 November 2005 interviews with participants at an IGRA rodeo in Mesquite, Texas
 Ayers, Chris.  "Homosexual on the range: rodeo where gay cowboys can ride high," The Sunday Times, 14 January 2006
 Greenfield, Beth.  "Gay Rodeos; Tightly Knit and Western-Loving," The New York Times, 24 February 2006
 "Out of the chute and in the pit," Gay and Lesbian Times, 10 September 2009 interview with gay rodeo officials in San Diego

Rodeo organizations
International LGBT sports organizations
Recurring sporting events established in 1976
Sports organizations established in 1985
History of Hayward, California
Culture of Hayward, California
1985 establishments in the United States